Amparo Dávila (February 28, 1928 – April 18, 2020) was a Mexican writer best known for her short stories touching on the fantastic and the uncanny. She won the Xavier Villarrutia Award in 1977 for her short story collection, Árboles petrificados. In 2015 a literary prize in her honor was created in Mexico for the best story within the genre of "the fantastic": the Premio Bellas Artes del Cuento Fantástico Amparo Dávila.

Life
Dávila was born in Pinos, a town in Zacatecas, Mexico. She learned to love reading at an early age by spending time in her father's library. Her childhood was marked by fear, a theme that appeared in a number of her future works as an author. Her first published work was Salmos bajo la luna in 1950. This was followed by Meditaciones a la orilla del sueńo and Perfil de soledades. In 1954 she moved to Mexico City where she worked as Alfonso Reyes's secretary. In 1966 she was a part of the Centro Mexicano de Escritores (Mexican Writers' Center) where she received a grant to continue writing. In 2008, Davila was recognized by the Palacio de Bellas Artes in Mexico City.

Work 
Davila is known for her use of themes of insanity, danger, and death, typically dealing with a female protagonist.  Many of her protagonists appear to have mental disorders and lash out, often violently, against others. Many times the women are still unable to escape from their mental issues and live with the actions they have taken.  She also plays with ideas of time by using time as a symbol of that which we cannot change.

Her other works include:

Salmos bajo la luna (1950)
Meditaciones a la orilla del sueño (1954)
Perfil de soledades (1954)
Tiempo destrozado (1959)
Música concreta (1964)
Árboles petrificados (1977)
Muerte en el bosque (1985)

English Translations 

 The Houseguest and Other Stories (New Directions, 2018) tr. Audrey Harris and Matthew Gleeson

Death
Amparo Dávila's death was announced by the Secretary of Culture of Zacatecas on April 18, 2020. In 2018 she wrote:

References

External links 

"The Fern Cat: On Translating Amparo Dávila's 'Moses and Gaspar.'" Audrey Harris, The Paris Review, 21 February 2017.
"Ghosts Embodied: The Visions of Amparo Davila" Darren Huang, 3:AM Magazine, 6 November 2018.
""The Houseguest and Other Stories by Amparo Dávila Amber Wheeler Bacon, Ploughshares at Emerson College, 16 November 2018.
"Amparo Dávila's short stories are beautifully wrought nightmares" by Juan Vidal, Los Angeles Times, 30 November 2018.
“'Who Would Read Me, Lower Your Eyes': Remembering Amparo Dávila" Matthew Gleeson, Los Angeles Review of Books, 26 June 2020.

1928 births
2020 deaths
People from Zacatecas
Mexican women novelists
Mexican women poets
Mexican women short story writers
Mexican short story writers